Cubi XI is an abstract sculpture by  David Smith. It is a part of the Cubi series of sculptures.

Constructed in 1963, it was installed on April 21, 1964, at 1875 Connecticut Avenue, N.W. near Sheridan Circle.
It is in the National Gallery of Art Sculpture Garden.

See also
 List of public art in Washington, D.C., Ward 2

References

External links
Cubi XI
Cubi XI

1963 sculptures
Abstract sculptures in Washington, D.C.
Collections of the National Gallery of Art
Cubist sculptures
Modernist sculpture
National Gallery of Art Sculpture Garden
Outdoor sculptures in Washington, D.C.
Sculptures by David Smith
Steel sculptures in Washington, D.C.